is a passenger railway station located in the city of Hannō, Saitama, Japan, jointly operated by East Japan Railway Company (JR East) and the private railway operator Seibu Railway.

Lines
It is 25.6 kilometers from the official starting point of the line at Hachiōji.

Station layout

JR Higashi-Hanno Station
The JR East station consists of one ground-level island platform serving three tracks, one of which is used exclusively for freight operations. The platform is connected by a footbridge to the neighboring station building. The station is staffed.

Seibu Higashi-Hanno Station

The Seibu station consists of one ground-level side platform, serving a single bidirectional track,  connected to the JR platform and the station building by a footbridge.

Platforms

History
The station opened on December 10, 1931, as a joint station of Japanese Government Railways and the Musashino Railway (present-day Seibu).

Station numbering was introduced on all Seibu Railway lines during fiscal 2012, with Higashi-Hannō Station becoming "SI27".

Passenger statistics
In fiscal 2019, the Seibu station was the 79th busiest on the Seibu network with an average of 5,651 passengers daily.

In fiscal 2019, the JR station was used by an average of 5751 passengers daily (boarding passengers only).

The passenger figures for previous years are as shown below. Note that the figures for JR East consider only boarding passengers whereas those for Seibu consider both boarding and disembarking passengers.

Surrounding area
Hannō Post Office
Hannō City Hall

References

External links

 JR East station information 
 Seibu station information 

Railway stations in Japan opened in 1931
Railway stations in Saitama Prefecture
Stations of East Japan Railway Company
Hachikō Line
Stations of Seibu Railway
Hannō